Swing Parade of 1946 is a 1946 musical comedy film directed by Phil Karlson and released by Monogram Pictures. The film features Gale Storm, Phil Regan, and The Three Stooges (Moe Howard, Larry Fine and Curly Howard), Edward Brophy and musical numbers by Connee Boswell and the Louis Jordan and Will Osborne orchestras, including "Stormy Weather" and "Caldonia".

Premise
The Three Stooges, as dishwashers, help an aspiring singer, Carol Lawrence (Storm), and a nightclub owner, Danny Warren (Regan), find love.

Three Stooges appearance

The Stooges rework several bits they performed with Ted Healy at MGM: the plumbing sequences are adapted from Meet the Baron and several waiter gags are borrowed from Beer and Pretzels.  Swing Parade of 1946 was filmed over a period of 24 days between July 30 and August 25, 1945.

42-year-old Curly Howard had suffered a series of minor strokes several months prior to filming, and his performances in their Columbia shorts at that time were often sluggish and lethargic. By the time of Swing Parade of 1946, he had lost a considerable amount of weight, and had difficulty maintaining his trademark falsetto voice. He appears somewhat more healthy and animated in this film, however, possibly due to The Stooges' supporting roles being less strenuous than in the shorts, where Curly was in virtually every scene. He is also billed as "Jerome Howard" in the credits, for the first time in many years.

Director Nicholas Ray worked uncredited on the screenplay. This was Ray's only collaboration with the Three Stooges.

See also
The Three Stooges filmography

References

External links 
 
 

1946 films
1946 musical comedy films
1946 romantic comedy films
American musical comedy films
American romantic comedy films
American romantic musical films
The Three Stooges films
Monogram Pictures films
Films directed by Phil Karlson
1940s romantic musical films
American black-and-white films
1940s American films